Carlos Romo (born 27 October 1966) is a Mexican swimmer. He competed at the 1984 Summer Olympics and the 1988 Summer Olympics.

References

External links
 

1966 births
Living people
Mexican male swimmers
Olympic swimmers of Mexico
Swimmers at the 1984 Summer Olympics
Swimmers at the 1988 Summer Olympics
Place of birth missing (living people)